A Blakely rifle is one of a series of rifled muzzle-loading cannon designed by British army officer Captain Theophilus Alexander Blakely. They were widely sold outside of the British army, and were best known for their use by the Confederate States of America during the American Civil War.

History 
Blakely tried to interest the British government in his designs but without success. His designs involved a cast-iron core with wrought-iron or steel banding to reinforce the breech.  The design is similar to that of the Armstrong guns of Sir William George Armstrong.  Blakely believed that Armstrong had infringed upon his patents, so when Armstrong became superintendent of the Royal Arsenal at Woolwich, Blakely stopped offering his designs to the British Army.

Blakely instead started selling cannons of his design to the Confederate States of America.  He did not actually manufacture the guns, but rather contracted out the manufacturing to such companies as Fawcett, Preston, & Company of Liverpool, Vavasseur of London, George Forrester and Company of Liverpool, Low Moor Iron Company, and the Blakely Ordnance Company of London, in which he may have had an interest. In all, the cannon foundries produced some 400 guns to Blakely's design, most being made of iron. Blakely also sold some guns to Russia, and apparently Massachusetts bought eight 9-inch and four 11-inch models.

Because Blakely continued to experiment with designs, there are at least five and possibly ten different designs, many of which came in several variants.  There were at least nine varieties of 3.5-inch 12-pounder rifles.  The two primary rifling types appear to have involved flat-sided bores or bores with grooves cut in them into which flanges on the shells would fit.

Variations 
The foundries manufactured Blakely rifles in 2.5-inch (6-pounder), 2.9-inch, 3.5-inch (12-pounder), 3.75-inch (16-pounder), 4-inch (18-pounder), 4.5-inch (20-pounder), 6.4-inch (100-pounder), 7-inch (120-pounder), 7.5-inch (150-pounder), 8-inch (200-pounder), 9-inch (250-pounder), 11-inch and 12.75-inch (450-pounder shells or 650-pound solid shot) bores.
  
One famous Blakely rifle was "The Widow Blakely", a 7.5-inch rifle that the Confederates used during their defense of Vicksburg, Mississippi, in 1863. On May 22, 1863, a shell exploded while in the gun's barrel while the widow was firing at a Union gunboat.  The explosion only took part of the end of the muzzle off. The Confederates cut what had been a 124-inch-long barrel back to 100 inches and continued to use the rifle as a mortar until Vicksburg fell.

References

External links 

 Captain Alexander Blakely RA—A biography

Artillery of the United Kingdom
Field artillery of the Confederate States of America
Field artillery
Muzzleloaders